Popularly known as Igwe 2Pac, Charles Okocha is a Nigerian actor known for playing bad boy roles. Charles Okocha was one of the mentors for 'Idea Challenge'. He won the Vskit Voice Competition in 2019.

Personal life 
In 2019, He was allegedly shot in Asaba by a policeman and underwent emergency surgery in the United States as a result.

Controversy 
A video clip circulating online got his fans angry, The actor was alleged accused of destroying his friend's car while dragging his daughter to a car. Charles Okocha cleared the air and confirmed the clip was a scene in a movie.

References

Year of birth missing (living people)
Living people